Athletics competitions have been held at the quadrennial Micronesian Games, that are open for the 10 member federations of the Micronesian Games Council, since the inaugural edition 1969 in Saipan, then Trust Territory of the Pacific Islands (now Northern Mariana Islands).

Editions
Some host cities were extracted from national record lists of Micronesian
Games Council members.

Medals
Medal winners for the athletics events of the Micronesian Games until 2006
were published courtesy of Tony Isaacs.

See also
List of Micronesian Games records in athletics

References

External links
Athletics medallists from 1969–2006 Micronesian Games

 
Micronesian Games